Ashness Bridge is a traditional stone-built bridge on the single-track road from the Borrowdale road (B5289) to Watendlath, in the English Lake District, Cumbria.

The brisge is at grid reference , and is known for being a fine viewpoint across Borrowdale towards Skiddaw, including views of Derwent Water nearby.

It or its predecessor may have been a packhorse bridge conveying packhorse traffic from Watendlath to Keswick.

Near the bridge is a small cairn to Bob Graham, who ran a round of 42 Lakeland peaks in 1932 (in under 24 hours), a record which was not equalled for 28 years.

The area is owned by the National Trust.

See also

Birks Bridge
Listed buildings in Borrowdale
Slater's Bridge

References

Bridges in Cumbria
Stone bridges in England
Packhorse bridges
Allerdale
Lake District